Kintbury is a village and civil parish in Berkshire, England, between the towns of Newbury and Hungerford.

Amenities
Amenities in the village have included the Church of England parish church, primary school, a post office, a corner shop, and a bakery. A Roman Catholic youth retreat  and work centre, St Cassian's Centre, is south-west of the village centre, between Inglewood and Titcomb. There are two pubs in the village; The Blue Ball and The Dundas Arms. The village has sports facilities including tennis, bowls and football clubs, as well as an indoor leisure centre. The village has an area of Site of Special Scientific Interest on its south eastern border called Catmore and Winterly Copses. The Village has a Local nature reserve called Kintbury Newt Ponds.

Transport
The Kennet and Avon Canal runs through the village at Kintbury Lock. A horse drawn widebeam canal boat runs public trips from Kintbury, either towards Newbury or towards Hungerford.

Sport and leisure

The village holds an annual "Ray Boxshall Orienteering Fun Day".  An orienteering event named after Ray Boxshall who was heavily involved in running the event in the years before he died. Kintbury has two amateur dramatic societies - The Kintbury Players (who generally perform comedic plays), and St Mary's Drama Group who perform an annual pantomime in the Easter half term holiday. Kintbury has a Sports and Leisure centre - the Kintbury Jubilee Centre, run by the community for the community, with fitness classes, clubs, and a hall available to hire. Kintbury is also home to North Berks Football League club Kintbury Rangers F.C., who play at the Recreation Ground. Notable former players include Southampton F.C striker Charlie Austin and former Everton player Brett Angell.

Notable residents

George Cherry (1822–1887), cricketer and barrister
Robert Harris, author of well-known novels including Fatherland, Enigma and Pompeii
Anthony Howard, political journalist, attended school there.
Roger Mortimer (horse racing journalist) spent his final years living in Kintbury.
Chapman Pincher lived there for many years.
Sir Gordon Richards, 26 times champion jockey, spent his final years there and is buried there.
William Winterbourne, hanged at Reading Gaol for his part in the Swing Riots of 1830, buried in the churchyard

Demography

References

External links

 Kintbury village website
 Kintbury Players
 Kintbury Jubilee Centre
 

 
Villages in Berkshire
Civil parishes in Berkshire
West Berkshire District